Yijun County is a county in the central part of Shaanxi province, China. It is the northernmost county-level division of the prefecture-level city of Tongchuan, and is located to the north of Guanzhong and at the southern edge of the Loess Plateau.

Administrative divisions
As 2020, Yijun County is divided to 1 subdistrict, 6 towns and 1 township.
Subdistricts
 Yiyang Subdistrict

Towns

Townships
 Yunmeng Township

Climate

Transportation
China National Highway 210
Xi'an–Yan'an Railway

References

County-level divisions of Shaanxi
Tongchuan